Szeghalom is a town in Békés county, in southeastern Hungary.

History

The jewish community
In the 19th and 20th centuries, a Jewish community with hundreds of members lived in the village.

On March 19, 1944, after the German army entered Hungary, the village Jews were forbidden to leave. In May, the Jews were concentrated in the ghetto established around the synagogue.
On June 26, 1944, the village's Jews were transported by train to the Szolnok ghetto, from where they were sent to the Auschwitz extermination camp and murdered in the Holocaust.

Sport
Szeghalom's football club Szeghalmi FC plays the regional 1 league. It has a stadium with a capacity of over 500 people.

Twin towns – sister cities

Szeghalom is twinned with:
 Sâncraiu, Romania
 Scheibbs, Austria
 Trasaghis, Italy

Notable people
Ferenc Szisz, the world's 1st Grand Prix motor racing winner

Gallery

References

External links

 in Hungarian
Aerial photographs of Szeghalom

Populated places in Békés County
Jewish communities destroyed in the Holocaust